The Embassy of Denmark to the Czech Republic is located on Maltézské Náměsti (Maltese Square), in Mala Strana, Prague.

External links

 Official Website of the Embassy of Denmark in Prague

Denmark
Ptague
Czech Republic–Denmark relations